The Honda CB300R is a CB series  single-cylinder standard/naked bike made by Honda since 2017. The CB300R debuted at the 2017 EICMA, and went on sale in Europe and Asia in 2017 and the US in 2018. It is one of the Neo Sports Café lineup of bikes offered by Honda, with the other being CB125R, Thai-market CB150R, CB250R, CB650R and 2018 CB1000R.

The CB250R is a lower-displacement variant of the CB300R sold in Japan and Malaysia.

Features 
The bike has dual-channel ABS but no riding modes, traction control system, adjustable levers, hazard lights, cornering lights, adaptive brake light, engine braking control, or Bluetooth.

2022 update 
Four new colors were introduced, as well as an assist-and-slipper clutch, 41mm forks, Cornering ABS, and Combined ABS.

References

External links 

 

CB300R
Standard motorcycles
Motorcycles introduced in 2017